Railway stations in Surat Thani Province (From North to South)

Surat Thani Province
Thailand transport-related lists
Surat Thani Province
Buildings and structures in Surat Thani province
Lists of buildings and structures in Thailand